Meteoro was a brigantine of the Chilean Navy originally built in New Orleans for the Mexican Navy prior to the Mexican–American War. During its service in the Chilean Navy the ship engaged in the suppression of the Mutiny of Cambiazo in the Straits of Magellan. In 1859 Meteoro, commanded by Martín Aguayo, almost sunk at during a storm in Cape Horn while its companion ship Pizarro commanded by Francisco Hudson was lost.

References

Brigantines of the Chilean Navy
Brigantines of the Mexican Navy
1848 ships